The little penguin (Eudyptula minor) is a species of penguin from New Zealand. They are commonly known as little blue penguins or blue penguins owing to their slate-blue plumage and are also known by their Māori name .

The Australian little penguin (Eudyptula novaehollandiae) from Australia and the Otago region of New Zealand is considered a separate species by a 2016 study and a 2019 study.

Taxonomy

The little penguin was first described by German naturalist Johann Reinhold Forster in 1781. Several subspecies are known, but a precise classification of these is still a matter of dispute. The holotypes of the subspecies E. m. variabilis and Eudyptula minor chathamensis are in the collection of the Museum of New Zealand Te Papa Tongarewa. The white-flippered penguin (E. m. albosignata or E. m. minor morpha albosignata) is currently considered by most taxonomists to be a colour morph or subspecies of Eudyptula minor. In 2008, Shirihai treated the little penguin and white-flippered penguin as allospecies. However, as of 2012, the IUCN and BirdLife International consider the white-flippered penguin to be a subspecies or morph of the little penguin.

Little penguins from New Zealand and Australia were once considered to be the same species, called Eudyptula minor. Analysis of mtDNA in 2002 revealed two clades in Eudyptula: one containing little penguins of New Zealand's North Island, Cook Strait and Chatham Island, as well as the white-flippered penguin, and a second containing little penguins of Australia and the Otago region of New Zealand. Preliminary analysis of braying calls and cluster analysis of morphometrics partially supported these results. A 2016 study described the Australian little penguin as a new and separate species, Eudyptula novaehollandiae. E. minor is endemic to New Zealand, while E. novaehollandiae is found in Australia and Otago. A 2019 study supported the recognition of E. minor and E. novaehollandiae as separate species.

Description
Like those of all penguins, the wings of Eudyptula species have developed into flippers used for swimming. 

The head and upper parts are blue in colour, with slate-grey ear coverts fading to white underneath, from the chin to the belly. Their flippers are blue in colour. The dark grey-black beak is 3–4 cm long, the irises pale silvery- or bluish-grey or hazel, and the feet pink above with black soles and webbing. An immature individual will have a shorter bill and lighter upperparts.

Like most seabirds, the Eudyptula species have a long lifespan. The average for the species is 6.5 years, but flipper ringing experiments show that in very exceptional cases they may live up to 25 years in captivity.

Eudyptula minor does not have the distinct bright blue feathers that distinguish Eudyptula novaehollandiae. In addition, the vocalisation patterns of the New Zealand lineage located on Tiritiri Matangi Island vary from the Australian lineage located in Oamaru. Females are known to prefer the local call of the New Zealand lingeage.

There are also behavioural differences that help differentiate these penguins. Those of the Australian lineage will swim together in a large group after dusk and walk along the shore to reach their nesting sites. This may be an effective predator avoidance strategy by traveling in a large group simultaneously. This has not been seen by those of the New Zealand lineage. Eudyptula minor only recently encountered terrestrial vertebrate predators, while Eudyptula novaehollandiae would have had to deal with carnivorous marsupials.

Also, Eudyptula novaehollandiae located in Australia will double brood. Birds will double brood by laying another clutch of eggs in hopes to increase their reproductive success. They complete this after the first clutch has successfully fledged. They may also do this due to the increasing sea surface temperatures and changing sources of food that are available. This behaviour has never been observed by those in New Zealand.

Distribution and habitat

New Zealand 
Eudyptula minor breeds along most of the coastline of New Zealand, including the Chatham Islands. However, Eudyptula minor does not occur in Otago, which is located on the east coast of New Zealand's South Island. The Australian species Eudyptula novaehollandiae occurs in Otago. E. novaehollandiae was originally endemic to Australia. Using ancient-DNA analysis and radiocarbon dating using historical, pre-human, as well as archaeological Eudyptula remains, the arrival of the Australian species in New Zealand was determined to have occurred roughly between AD 1500 and 1900. When the E. minor population declined in New Zealand, it left a genetic opening for E. novaehollandiae. The decrease of E. minor was most likely due to anthropogenic effects, such as being hunted by humans as well as introduced predators, including dogs brought from overseas.

It has been determined that the population of Eudyptula novaehollandiae in Otago arrived even more recently than previously estimated due to mulitlocus coalescent analyses.

Overall, little penguin populations in New Zealand have been decreasing. Some colonies have become extinct, and others continue to be at risk. Some new colonies have been established in urban areas. The species is not considered endangered in New Zealand, with the exception of the white-flippered subspecies found only on Banks Peninsula and nearby Motunau Island. Since the 1960s, the mainland population has declined by 60-70%; though a small increase has occurred on Motunau Island. A colony exists in Wellington Harbor on Matiu / Somes Island.

Outside of Australasia 
Eudyptula species have also been reported from Chile, where they are known as pingüino pequeño or pingüino azul. Sightings include Isla Chañaral 1996 and Playa de Santo Domingo, San Antonio, 16 March 1997. Eudyptula species have also been reported from South Africa, It is unclear whether these birds were vagrants.

Behaviour

Feeding 
Little penguins feed by hunting small clupeoid fish, cephalopods, and crustaceans, for which they travel and dive quite extensively including to the sea floor. Important little penguin prey items include arrow squid, slender sprat, Graham's gudgeon, red cod, and ahuru.

Threats 

Protestors have opposed the development of a marina at Kennedy Point, Waiheke Island in New Zealand for the risk it poses to little penguins and their habitat. Protesters claimed that they exhausted all legal means to oppose the project and have had to resort to occupation and non-violent resistance. Several arrests have been made for trespassing.

Introduced predators 
Introduced mammalian predators present the greatest terrestrial risk to little penguins and include cats, dogs, rats, and particularly ferrets and stoats. As examples significant dog attacks have been recorded at the colony at Little Kaiteriteri Beach, and a suspected stoat or ferret attack at Doctor's Point near Dunedin, New Zealand claimed the lives of 29 little blue penguins in November 2014.

Oil spills 
Little penguin populations have been significantly affected by a major oil spill with the grounding of the Rena off New Zealand in 2011, which killed 2,000 seabirds (including little penguins) directly, and killed an estimated 20,000 in total based on wider ecosystem impacts. Oil spills are the most common cause of the little penguins being admitted to the rehabilitation facilities at Phillip Island Nature Park (PINP). These oil spill recurrences have endangered not just the little penguins, but the entire penguin population. This can further decline the population, which can lead to possible extinction.

Conservation 
Eudyptula species are classified as "at risk - declining" under New Zealand's Wildlife Act 1953.

Zoological exhibits 

Zoological exhibits featuring purpose-built enclosures for Eudyptula species can be seen in Australia at the Adelaide Zoo, Melbourne Zoo, the National Zoo & Aquarium in Canberra, Perth Zoo, Caversham Wildlife Park (Perth), Ballarat Wildlife Park, Sea Life Sydney Aquarium, and the Taronga Zoo in Sydney. Enclosures include nesting boxes or similar structures for the animals to retire into, a reconstruction of a pool and in some cases, a transparent aquarium wall to allow patrons to view the animals underwater while they swim.

Eudyptula penguin exhibit exists at Sea World, on the Gold Coast, Queensland, Australia. In early March 2007, 25 of the 37 penguins died from an unknown toxin following a change of gravel in their enclosure. It is still not known what caused the deaths of the penguins, and it was decided not to return the 12 surviving penguins to the same enclosure where the penguins became ill. A new enclosure for the little penguin colony was opened at Sea World in 2008.

In New Zealand, Eudyptula penguin exhibits exist at the Auckland Zoo, the Wellington Zoo, and the National Aquarium of New Zealand. Since 2017, the National Aquarium of New Zealand, has featured a monthly "Penguin of the Month" board, declaring two of their resident animals the "Naughty" and "Nice" penguin for that month. Photos of the board have gone viral and gained the aquarium a large worldwide social media following.

In the United States, Eudyptula penguins can be seen at the Louisville Zoo the Bronx Zoo, and the Cincinnati Zoo.

See also

Notes

References

Further reading

External links

 State of Penguins: Little (blue) penguin – detailed and current species account of (Eudyptula minor) in New Zealand
Little penguins at the International Penguin Conservation
Little penguin at PenguinWorld
West Coast Penguin Trust (New Zealand)
Philip Island Nature Park website
Gould's The Birds of Australia plate
 

little penguin
little penguin
Subterranean nesting birds
Birds of New Zealand
Birds described in 1781